Daniel Farke (born 30 October 1976) is a German professional football manager and former player who played as a forward. He is currently the head coach of German Bundesliga club Borussia Mönchengladbach.

He spent most of his playing career with SV Lippstadt, where he also began his management career. After a spell at Borussia Dortmund II, he led Norwich City for four years, twice winning the EFL Championship. In January 2022 he was appointed as head coach of Russian Premier League club Krasnodar, but resigned two months later due to the Russian invasion of Ukraine.

Playing career
Farke started his career with hometown club SV Steinhausen. He spent the majority of his playing career with SV Lippstadt 08, with whom he had three spells. Farke said that he "knew how to score" but was probably "the slowest striker in the whole of Western Europe". He played his whole career in the lower levels of German football.

Managerial career

Early managerial career
Farke began his managerial career with SV Lippstadt 08. He was in charge for six years and took Lippstadt from the sixth tier of German football to the fourth, with his time in charge considered the most successful for Lippstadt football. He stepped down after six years, planning to take a year's sabbatical, before accepting the opportunity to take charge of Borussia Dortmund II, the reserve side of German club Borussia Dortmund. He managed the team for two seasons before he was recruited by Norwich City, having failed to agree a new contract at Dortmund.

Norwich City
On 25 May 2017, Farke was appointed as the head coach of Championship club Norwich City on a two-year contract. Farke's first league game for Norwich City ended in a 1–1 draw after a late equaliser from Nélson Oliveira at Craven Cottage and his first competitive game at Carrow Road saw Norwich beat Swindon Town 3–2 in the EFL Cup. Farke completed his inaugural season in the Championship winning 15 games, drawing 15, and losing 16 – finishing 14th in the league table.

The following season saw Norwich promoted as Championship title winners. Farke won the Manager of the Month award for November and in March 2019 signed a three-year contract extension, tying him to the club until June 2022. The team secured promotion to the Premier League on their penultimate match of the 2018–19 season, before securing the league title after the last match of the season.

Norwich were instantly relegated back, following a 4–0 home loss to West Ham United on 12 July 2020. In 2020–21, Norwich won the Championship and secured an immediate return to the Premier League with a club record 97 points. Farke was subsequently named EFL Championship Manager of the Season. On 21 July 2021, Farke signed a new four-year contract with the club, keeping him at Carrow Road until July 2025.

In September 2021, Farke lost his 15th consecutive Premier League game in charge of Norwich, a record for a club or a manager in English top-flight history. On 6 November, the day his team  recorded their first league win of the season with a 2–1 away victory over Brentford, Farke was sacked after the game and replaced by former Aston Villa head coach Dean Smith on 15 November 2021.

Krasnodar
On 13 January 2022, Krasnodar announced that Farke had been appointed as the club's new head coach on a contract until 30 June 2024. He left the club on 2 March, along with the rest of his coaching staff, due to the Russian invasion of Ukraine. Due to the winter break and Krasnodar International Airport's military use, he did not manage in any matches for the club.

Borussia Mönchengladbach
On 4 June 2022, Farke was appointed head coach of Borussia Mönchengladbach on a three-year deal. His first match was a 9–1 win at amateurs SV Oberachern in the DFB-Pokal first round; six days later he won 3–1 at home to 1899 Hoffenheim in the first Bundesliga match of his entire career.

Managerial statistics

Honours

SV Lippstadt
Oberliga Westfalen: 2012–13
Westfalenliga Group 1: 2011–12

Norwich City
EFL Championship: 2018–19, 2020–21

Individual
EFL Championship Manager of the Month: November 2018
EFL Championship Manager of the Season: 2020–21
LMA Championship Manager of the Year: 2021

References

External links

1976 births
Living people
People from Paderborn (district)
Sportspeople from Detmold (region)
Footballers from North Rhine-Westphalia
German footballers
Association football forwards
SC Paderborn 07 players
SV Lippstadt 08 players
SV Wilhelmshaven players
Bonner SC players
SV Meppen players
Oberliga (football) players
German football managers
Borussia Dortmund II managers
Norwich City F.C. managers
FC Krasnodar managers
Borussia Mönchengladbach managers
Oberliga (football) managers
Regionalliga managers
English Football League managers
Premier League managers
Bundesliga managers
German expatriate football managers
Expatriate football managers in England
German expatriate sportspeople in England
Expatriate football managers in Russia
German expatriate sportspeople in Russia